African-American Vernacular English (AAVE) is the variety of English natively spoken, particularly in urban communities, by most working- and middle-class African Americans and some Black Canadians.

Having its own unique grammatical, vocabulary, and accent features, AAVE is employed by middle-class Black Americans as the more informal and casual end of a sociolinguistic continuum. However, in formal speaking contexts, speakers tend to switch to more standard English grammar and vocabulary, usually while retaining elements of the nonstandard accent. Despite being widespread throughout the United States, AAVE should not be assumed to be the native dialect of all African Americans.

As with most African-American English, African-American Vernacular English shares a large portion of its grammar and phonology with the rural dialects of the Southern United States, and especially older Southern American English, due to the historical enslavement of African Americans primarily in that region.

Mainstream linguists maintain that the parallels between AAVE, West African languages, and English-based creole languages are existent but minor, with African-American Vernacular English genealogically still falling under the English language, demonstrably tracing back to the diverse nonstandard dialects of early English settlers in the Southern United States. However, a minority of linguists argue that the vernacular shares so many characteristics with African creole languages spoken around the world that it could have originated as its own English-based creole or semi-creole language, distinct from the English language, before undergoing a process of decreolization.

Origins 
African-American Vernacular English (AAVE) may be considered a dialect, ethnolect or sociolect. While it is clear that there is a strong historical relationship between AAVE and earlier Southern U.S. dialects, the origins of AAVE are still a matter of debate.

The presiding theory among linguists is that AAVE has always been a dialect of English, meaning that it originated from earlier English dialects rather than from English-based creole languages that "decreolized" back into English. In the early 2000s, Shana Poplack provided corpus-based evidence—evidence from a body of writing—from isolated enclaves in Samaná and Nova Scotia peopled by descendants of migrations of early AAVE-speaking groups (see Samaná English) that suggests that the grammar of early AAVE was closer to that of contemporary British dialects than modern urban AAVE is to other current American dialects, suggesting that the modern language is a result of divergence from mainstream varieties, rather than the result of decreolization from a widespread American creole.

Linguist John McWhorter maintains that the contribution of West African languages to AAVE is minimal. In an interview on National Public Radio's Talk of the Nation, McWhorter characterized AAVE as a "hybrid of regional dialects of Great Britain that slaves in America were exposed to because they often worked alongside the indentured servants who spoke those dialects..." According to McWhorter, virtually all linguists who have carefully studied the origins of AAVE "agree that the West African connection is quite minor."

However, a creole theory, less accepted among linguists, posits that AAVE arose from one or more creole languages used by African captives of the Atlantic slave trade, due to the captives speaking many different native languages and therefore needing a new way to communicate among themselves and with their captors. According to this theory, these captives first developed what are called pidgins: simplified mixtures of languages. Since pidgins form from close contact between speakers of different languages, the slave trade would have been exactly such a situation. Creolist John Dillard quotes, for example, slave ship captain William Smith describing the sheer diversity of mutually unintelligible languages just in The Gambia. By 1715, an African pidgin was reproduced in novels by Daniel Defoe, in particular, The Life of Colonel Jacque. In 1721, Cotton Mather conducted the first attempt at recording the speech of slaves in his interviews regarding the practice of smallpox inoculation. By the time of the American Revolution, varieties among slave creoles were not quite mutually intelligible. Dillard quotes a recollection of "slave language" toward the latter part of the 18th century: "Kay, massa, you just leave me, me sit here, great fish jump up into da canoe, here he be, massa, fine fish, massa; me den very grad; den me sit very still, until another great fish jump into de canoe; but me fall asleep, massa, and no wake 'til you come...." Not until the time of the American Civil War did the language of the slaves become familiar to a large number of educated Whites. The abolitionist papers before the war form a rich corpus of examples of plantation creole. In Army Life in a Black Regiment (1870), Thomas Wentworth Higginson detailed many features of his Black soldiers' language. Opponents of the creole theory suggest that such pidgins or creoles existed but simply died out without directly contributing to modern AAVE.

Harvard professor Sunn m'Cheaux says the immediate future tense (for example "I'ma") originated in the Gullah language (an English creole), which uses "a-" instead of "-ing" for this type of verb inflection.

Phonology 

Many pronunciation features distinctly set AAVE apart from other forms of American English (particularly, General American). McWhorter argues that what truly unites all AAVE accents is a uniquely wide-ranging intonation pattern or "melody", which characterizes even the most "neutral" or light African-American accent. A handful of multisyllabic words in AAVE differ from General American in their stress placement so that, for example, police, guitar, and Detroit are pronounced with initial stress instead of ultimate stress. The following are phonological differences in AAVE vowel and consonant sounds.

Vowels

African American Vowel Shift: AAVE accents have traditionally resisted the cot-caught merger spreading nationwide, with  pronounced  and  traditionally pronounced , though now often . This chain shift is called the "African American Shift". However, there is still evidence of AAVE speakers picking up the cot-caught merger in Pittsburgh, Pennsylvania, in Charleston, South Carolina, Florida and Georgia, and in parts of California. 

Reduction of certain diphthong forms to monophthongs, in particular, the  vowel  is monophthongized to  except before voiceless consonants (this is also found in most White Southern dialects).
This is also present in other dialects, particularly of the South. The pin-pen merger is not universal in AAVE, and there is evidence for unmerged speakers in California, New York, New Jersey, and Pennsylvania.

Consonants
The phoneme's position in a word determines its exact sound.
Other examples include wedding → , morning → , nothing → .
 A marked feature of AAVE is final consonant cluster reduction. This is a process by which the pronunciations of consonant clusters at the end of certain words are reduced to pronouncing only the first consonant of that cluster. There are several phenomena that are similar but are governed by different grammatical rules. This tendency has been used by creolists to compare AAVE to West African languages since such languages do not have final clusters.
 Final consonant clusters that are homorganic (have the same place of articulation) and share the same voicing are reduced. It is the plosive ( and ) in these examples that is lost rather than the fricative; the nasal is also either preserved completely or lost with preservation of nasality on the preceding consonant. The clusters ,  are also affected.
 For younger speakers,  also occurs in words that other varieties of English have  so that, for example, street is pronounced .
 Similarly, final consonants may be deleted (although there is a great deal of variation between speakers in this regard). As with other dialects of English, final  and  may reduce to a glottal stop. Nasal consonants may be lost while nasalization of the vowel is retained (e.g., find may be pronounced ). More rarely,  and  may also be deleted.
 Use of metathesized forms like aks for "ask" or graps for "grasp".
 General non-rhotic behavior, in which the rhotic consonant  is typically dropped when not followed by a vowel; it may also manifest as an unstressed  or the lengthening of the preceding vowel. Intervocalic  may also be dropped, e.g. General American story can be pronounced , though this doesn't occur across morpheme boundaries.  may also be deleted between a consonant and a back rounded vowel, especially in words like throw, throat, and through.
The level of AAVE rhoticity is likely somewhat correlated with the rhoticity of White speakers in a given region; in 1960s research, AAVE accents tended to be mostly non-rhotic in Detroit, whose White speakers are rhotic, but completely non-rhotic in New York City, whose White speakers are also often non-rhotic.
Homonymy may be reduced by vowel lengthening and by an off-glide .

"Deep" phonology 
McWhorter discusses an accent continuum from "a 'deep' Black English through a 'light' Black English to standard English," saying the sounds on this continuum may vary from one African American speaker to the next or even in a single speaker from one situational context to the next. McWhorter regards the following as rarer features, characteristic only of a deep Black English but which speakers of light Black English may occasionally "dip into for humorous or emotive effect":
This is called th-fronting. This is called th-stopping. In other words, the tongue fully touches the top teeth.
Raising and fronting of the vowel  of words like strut, mud, tough, etc. to something like .

Grammar

Tense and aspect 
Although AAVE does not necessarily have the simple past-tense marker of other English varieties (that is, the -ed of "worked"), it does have an optional tense system with at least four aspects of the past tense and two aspects of the future tense. The term TMA marker is used for forms that are an integral part of the predicate phrase. The markers gon, done, be, and been were defined as markers of future tense, completive aspect, habitual aspect, and durative aspect.

Syntactically, I bought it is grammatical, but done (always unstressed, pronounced as /dən/) is used to emphasize the completed nature of the action.

As phase auxiliary verbs, been and done must occur as the first auxiliary; when they occur as the second, they carry additional aspects:
 He been done working means "he finished work a long time ago".
 He done been working means "until recently, he worked over a long period of time".

The latter example shows one of the most distinctive features of AAVE: the use of be to indicate that performance of the verb is of a habitual nature. In most other American English dialects, this can only be expressed unambiguously by using adverbs such as usually.

This aspect-marking form of been or BIN is stressed and semantically distinct from the unstressed form: She BIN running ('She has been running for a long time') and She been running ('She has been running'). This aspect has been given several names, including perfect phase, remote past, and remote phase (this article uses the third). As shown above, been places action in the distant past. However, when been is used with stative verbs or gerund forms, been shows that the action began in the distant past and that it is continuing now.  suggests that a better translation when used with stative verbs is "for a long time". For instance, in response to "I like your new dress", one might hear Oh, I been had this dress, meaning that the speaker has had the dress for a long time and that it isn't new.

To see the difference between the simple past and the gerund when used with been, consider the following expressions:
 I been bought her clothes means "I bought her clothes a long time ago".
 I been buying her clothes means "I've been buying her clothes for a long time".

  Finna corresponds to "fixing to" in other varieties. it is also written fixina, fixna, fitna, and finta
In addition to these, come (which may or may not be an auxiliary) may be used to indicate speaker indignation, such as in Don't come acting like you don't know what happened and you started the whole thing ('Don't try to act as if you don't know what happened, because you started the whole thing').

Negation 
Negatives are formed differently from most other varieties of English:

 Use of ain't as a general negative indicator. As in other dialects, it can be used where most other dialects would use am not, isn't, aren't, haven't, and hasn't. However, in marked contrast to other varieties of English in the US, some speakers of AAVE also use ain't instead of don't, doesn't, or didn't (e.g., I ain't know that). Ain't had its origins in common English but became increasingly stigmatized since the 19th century. See also amn't.
 Negative concord, popularly called "double negation", as in I didn't go nowhere; if the sentence is negative, all negatable forms are negated. This contrasts with standard written English conventions, which have traditionally prescribed that a double negative is considered incorrect to mean anything other than a positive (although this was not always so; see double negative).
 In a negative construction, an indefinite pronoun such as nobody or nothing can be inverted with the negative verb particle for emphasis (e.g., Don't nobody know the answer, Ain't nothing going on.)

While AAVE shares these with Creole languages,  use data from early recordings of African Nova Scotian English, Samaná English, and the recordings of former slaves to demonstrate that negation was inherited from nonstandard colonial English.

Other grammatical characteristics 
 The copula be in the present tense is often dropped, as in Russian, Hebrew, Arabic and other languages. For example: You crazy ("You're crazy") or She my sister ("She's my sister"). The phenomenon is also observed in questions: Who you? ("Who're you?") and Where you at? ("Where are you (at)?"). This has been sometimes considered a Southern U.S. regionalism, though it is most frequent in Black speech. On the other hand, a stressed is cannot be dropped: Yes, she is my sister. The general rules are:
 Only the forms is and are (of which the latter is anyway often replaced by is) can be omitted; am, was, and were are not deleted.
 These forms cannot be omitted when they would be pronounced with stress in General American (whether or not the stress serves specifically to impart an emphatic sense to the verb's meaning).
 These forms cannot be omitted when the corresponding form in standard English cannot show contraction (and vice versa). For example, I don't know where he is cannot be reduced to *I don't know where he just as in standard English forms the corresponding reduction *I don't know where he's is likewise impossible. (I don't know where he at is possible, paralleling I don't know where he's at in standard English.)
 Possibly some other minor conditions apply as well.
 Verbs are uninflected for number and person: there is no -s ending in the present-tense third-person singular. Example: She write poetry ("She writes poetry"). AAVE don't for standard English doesn't comes from this, unlike in some other dialects which use don't for standard English doesn't but does when not in the negative. Similarly, was is used for what in standard English are contexts for both was and were.
 The genitive -'s ending may or may not be used. Genitive case is inferrable from adjacency. This is similar to many creoles throughout the Caribbean. Many language forms throughout the world use an unmarked possessive; it may here result from a simplification of grammatical structures. Example: my momma sister ("my mother's sister")
 The words it and they denote the existence of something, equivalent to standard English's there is or there are.
 Word order in questions: Why they ain't growing? ("Why aren't they growing?") and Who the hell she think she is? ("Who the hell does she think she is?") lack the inversion of most other forms of English. Because of this, there is also no need for the "auxiliary do".
 Relative clauses which modify a noun in the object or predicate nominative position are not obligatorily introduced by a relative pronoun.

Vocabulary 
AAVE shares most of its lexicon with other varieties of English, particularly that of informal and Southern dialects; for example, the relatively recent use of y'all. As statistically shown by Algeo (1991: 3-14), the main sources for new words are combining, shifting, shortening, blending, borrowing, and creating. However, it has also been suggested that some of the vocabulary unique to AAVE has its origin in West African languages, but etymology is often difficult to trace, and without a trail of recorded usage, the suggestions below cannot be considered proven. Early AAVE and Gullah contributed a number of words of African origin to the American English mainstream, including gumbo, goober, yam, and banjo.

Compounding in AAVE is a very common method in creating new vocabulary. The most common type of compounding is the noun-noun combination. There is also the adjective-noun combination which is the second most occurring combination found in AAE slang. AAE also combines adjectives with other adjectives, which are not as common, but are more common than in standard American English.

AAVE has also contributed slang expressions such as cool and hip. In many cases, the postulated etymologies are not recognized by linguists or the Oxford English Dictionary, such as to dig, jazz, tote, and bad-mouth, a calque from Mandinka. African American slang is formed by words and phrases that are regarded as informal. It involves combining, shifting, shortening, blending, borrowing, and creating new words. African American slang possess all of the same lexical qualities and linguistic mechanisms as any other language. AAVE slang is more common in speech and vocabulary than it is in writing.

AAVE also has words that either are not part of most other American English dialects or have strikingly different meanings. For example, there are several words in AAVE referring to White people that are not part of mainstream American English; these include gray as an adjective for Whites (as in gray dude), possibly from the color of Confederate uniforms; and paddy, an extension of the slang use for "Irish". "Red bone" is another example of this, usually referring to light skinned African Americans.

"Ofay," which is pejorative, is another general term for a White person; it might derive from the Ibibio word afia, which means "light-colored", from the Yoruba word ofe, spoken in hopes of disappearing from danger. However, most dictionaries simply say its etymology is unknown.

Kitchen refers to the particularly curly or kinky hair at the nape of the neck, and siditty or seddity means "snobbish" or "bourgeois".<ref>, s.v. "Kitchen". Kitchen, siditty: Dictionary of American Regional English, s.vv. "Kitchen", "Siditty".</ref>

AAVE has also contributed many words and phrases to other varieties of English, including chill out, main squeeze, soul, funky, and threads.

Distinct phrases are widely used in African American slang. Reasons for it is its tendency for emotive expression and exaggeration. Phrases are very effective in translating the most complex meanings into visual images. Another reason for phrases is their rhythmic qualities, which are highly valued in African American slang. The most productive phrase patterns of AAE slang involve combinations of verbs and other parts of speech, including nouns which are accompanied by prepositions. This combination functions as an "extended verb".

Influence on other dialects
African-American Vernacular English has influenced the development of other dialects of English. The AAVE accent, New York accent, and Spanish-language accents have together yielded the sound of New York Latino English, some of whose speakers use an accent indistinguishable from an AAVE one. AAVE has also influenced certain Chicano accents and Liberian Settler English, directly derived from the AAVE of the original 16,000 African Americans who migrated to Liberia in the 1800s. In the United States, urban youth participating in hip-hop culture or marginalized as ethnic minorities are also well-studied in adopting African-American Vernacular English, or prominent elements of it: for example, Southeast-Asian Americans embracing hip-hop identities.

 Variation 
Urban versus rural variations
The first studies on the African American English (AAE) took place in cities such as New York, Los Angeles, and Chicago, to name a few. These studies concluded that the African American Language (AAL) was homogeneous, which means that AAE was spoken the same way everywhere around the country. Later, sociolinguists would realize that these cities lacked the influence of the rural south; the early studies had not considered the representation of the south of America, which caused the AAE studies to change. To make those changes, the newer studies used the diversity of the country and took into consideration the rural south.

African-American Vernacular English began as mostly rural and Southern, yet today is mostly urban and nationally widespread, and its more recent urban features are now even diffusing into rural areas. Urban AAVE alone is intensifying with the grammatical features exemplified in these sentences: "He be the best" (intensified equative be), "She be done had her baby" (resultative be done), and "They come hollerin" (indignant come). On the other hand, rural AAVE alone shows certain features too, such as: "I was a-huntin" (a-prefixing); "It riz above us" (different irregular forms); and "I want for to eat it" (for to complement). Using the word bees even in place of be to mean is or are in standard English, as in the sentence "That's the way it bees" is also one of the rarest of all deep AAVE features today, and most middle-class AAVE speakers would recognize the verb bees as part of only a deep "Southern" or "country" speaker's vocabulary.

Local variations
There are at least 10 distinct regional accents in AAVE, and regional patterns of pronunciation and word choice appear on Twitter and other social media.

Regional variation in AAVE does not pattern with other regional variation in North American English, which broadly follows East-to-West migration patterns, but instead patterns with the population movements during the Great Migration, resulting in a broadly South-to-North pattern, albeit with founder effects in cities that already had existing African American populations at the beginning of the Great Migration.
There is no vowel for which the geographic variation in AAVE patterns with that of White American English.

New York City AAVE incorporates some local features of the New York accent, including its high  vowel; meanwhile, conversely, Pittsburgh AAVE may merge this same vowel with the  vowel, matching the cot-caught merger of White Pittsburgh accents, though AAVE accents traditionally do not have the cot-caught merger. Memphis, Atlanta, and Research Triangle AAVE incorporates the  vowel raising and  vowel lowering associated with White Southern accents.
Californian AAVE often lacks a cot-caught merger, especially before nasals.

 Social context 
Although the distinction between AAVE and General American dialects is clear to most English speakers, some characteristics, notably double negatives and the omission of certain auxiliaries (see below) such as the has in has been are also characteristic of many colloquial dialects of American English. There is near-uniformity of AAVE grammar, despite its vast geographic spread across the whole country. This may be due in part to relatively recent migrations of African Americans out of the American South (see Great Migration and Second Great Migration) as well as to long-term racial segregation that kept Black people living together in largely homogeneous communities.

Misconceptions about AAVE are, and have long been, common, and have stigmatized its use. One myth is that AAVE is grammatically "simple" or "sloppy". However, like all dialects, AAVE shows consistent internal logic and grammatical complexity, and is used naturally by a group of people to express thoughts and ideas. Prescriptively, attitudes about AAVE are often less positive; since AAVE deviates from the standard, its use is commonly misinterpreted as a sign of ignorance, laziness, or both. Perhaps because of this attitude (as well as similar attitudes among other Americans), most speakers of AAVE are bidialectal, being able to speak with more standard English features, and perhaps even a General American accent, as well as AAVE. Such linguistic adaptation in different environments is called code-switching—though  argues that the situation is actually one of diglossia: each dialect, or code, is applied in different settings. Generally speaking, the degree of exclusive use of AAVE decreases with increasing socioeconomic status (although AAVE is still used by even well-educated African Americans).

Another misconception is that AAVE is the native dialect (or even more inaccurately, a linguistic fad) employed by all African Americans. Wheeler (1999) warns that "AAVE should not be thought of as the language of Black people in America. Many African Americans neither speak it nor know much about it".

 argues that the use of AAVE carries racially affirmative political undertones as its use allows African Americans to assert their cultural upbringing. Nevertheless, use of AAVE also carries strong social connotations;  presents a White female speaker of AAVE who is accepted as a member into African American social groups despite her race.

Before the substantial research of the 1960s and 1970s—including William Labov's groundbreakingly thorough grammatical study, Language in the Inner City—there was doubt that the speech of African Americans had any exclusive features not found in varieties spoken by other groups;  noted that distinctive features of African American speech were present in the speech of Southerners and  argued that there were really no substantial vocabulary or grammatical differences between the speech of Black people and other English dialects.

It is also seen and heard in advertising.

 In the legal system 

The United States courts are divided over how to admit statements of ambiguous tense made in AAVE under evidence. In United States v. Arnold, the United States Court of Appeals for the Sixth Circuit held that "he finna shoot me" was a statement made in the present tense, so it was admissible hearsay under the excited utterance exception; however, the dissent held that past or present tense could not be determined by the statement, so the statement should not have been admitted into evidence. Similarly, in Louisiana v. Demesme, the Louisiana Supreme Court ruled that the defendant's statement "why don’t you give me a lawyer, dog" was too ambiguous to be considered a Miranda request for a lawyer.

In US courts, an interpreter is only routinely available for speakers of "a language other than English".  argue that a lack of familiarity with AAVE (and other minority dialects of English) on the part of jurors, stenographers, and others can lead to misunderstandings in court. They especially focus on the Trayvon Martin case and how the testimony of Rachel Jeantel was perceived as incomprehensible and not credible by the jury due to her dialect.

A 2019 experimental study by researchers at the University of Pennsylvania, NYU, and Philadelphia Lawyers for Social Equity, found that court stenographers in Philadelphia regularly fail to transcribe AAVE accurately, with about 40 percent of sentences being inaccurate, and only 83% accuracy at the word level, despite court stenographers being certified at or above 95% accuracy. Their study suggests that there is evidence that court reporters may potentially introduce incorrect transcriptions into the official court record, with ramifications in cross-examination, jury deliberations, and appeals. A 2016 qualitative study by researchers at Stanford University also suggests that testimony in AAE — and other nonstandard varieties — is not necessarily always understood in a judicial setting.

 In music 
Spirituals, blues, jazz, R&B, and most recently, hip-hop are all genres associated with African American music; as such, AAVE usually appears, through singing, speaking, or rapping, in these musical forms. Examples of morphosyntactic features of AAVE in genres other than hip-hop are given below:

More recently, AAVE has been used heavily in hip-hop to show "street cred". Examples of morphosyntactic AAVE features used by Black hip-hop artists are given below:

In addition to grammatical features, lexical items specific to AAVE are often used in hip-hop:

Lexical items taken from 

Because hip-hop is so intimately related to the African American oral tradition, non-Black hip-hop artists also use certain features of AAVE; for example, in an MC battle, Eyedea said, "What that mean, yo?" displaying a lack of subject-verb inversion and also the "auxiliary do". However, they tend to avoid the term nigga, even as a marker of solidarity. White hip-hop artists such as Eyedea can choose to accentuate their whiteness by hyper-articulating postvocalic r sounds (i.e. the retroflex approximant).

AAVE is also used by non-Black artists in genres other than hip-hop, if less frequently. For instance, in "Tonight, Tonight", Hot Chelle Rae uses the term dime to mean "an attractive woman". Jewel's "Sometimes It Be That Way" employs habitual be in the title to indicate habitual aspect. If they do not employ similar features of AAVE in their speech, then it can be argued that they are modeling their musical performance to evoke aspects of particular musical genres such as R&B or the blues (as British pop musicians of the 1960s and beyond did to evoke rock, pop, and the blues). Some research suggests that non-African American young adults learn AAVE vocabulary by listening to hip-hop music.

 In social media 

On Twitter, AAVE is used as a framework from which sentences and words are constructed, in order to accurately express oneself. Grammatical features and word pronunciations stemming from AAVE are preserved. Spellings based on AAVE have become increasingly common, to the point where it has become a normalized practice. Some examples include, "you" (you're), "they" (their/they're), "gon/gone" (going to), and "yo" (your).

 In education 

Educators traditionally have attempted to eliminate AAVE usage through the public education system, perceiving the dialect as grammatically defective. In 1974, the teacher-led Conference on College Composition and Communication issued a position statement affirming students' rights to their own dialects and the validity of all dialects. Mainstream linguistics has long agreed with this view about dialects. In 1979, a judge ordered the Ann Arbor School District to find a way to identify AAVE speakers in the schools and to "use that knowledge in teaching such students how to read standard English." In 1996, Oakland Unified School District made a controversial resolution for AAVE, which was later called "Ebonics." The Oakland School board approved that Ebonics be recognized as a language independent from English (though this particular view is not endorsed by linguists), that teachers would participate in recognizing this language, and that it would be used in theory to support the transition from Ebonics to Standard American English in schools. This program lasted three years and then died off.

 See also 

 Africanisms
 Glossary of jive talk
 Gullah language
 Is-leveling
 Languages of the United States
 New Orleans English
 North American English regional phonology
 New Jersey English

 Notes 

 References 

 Bibliography 

 

 

 
 
 
 
 
 
 
 
 
 
 
 
 
 Dictionary of American Regional English.'' 5 vols. Cambridge: Harvard University Press, 1985–.

Further reading 

 
 
 
 
 
 
 
 
 
 

 
Dialects of English